Esthwaite Lodge is a 19th-century house in Hawkshead, Cumbria, England;  it is a Grade II listed building.

The house was commissioned by Thomas Alcock Beck, a local resident and antiquarian.  He employed Kendal-based architect George Webster to design a property for him.

Webster's design was a stuccoed villa of two storeys and three bays with a slate hipped roof. Completed in 1821 the house is in the Neoclassical Greek Revival style a Doric porch was added.

Beck died in 1846 but his widow and his descendants continued to live in the house until the early 20th century. The 1911 census for England, however, records the property as being unoccupied.

Ownership of the house passed to the Brocklebank family who leased the house to a number of tenants.  One of these, between 1929 and 1932 was the novelist Francis Brett Young until he decided that the weather was too wet for him.

With the outbreak of the Second World War the house was used for accommodating volunteers involved with the Hawkshead Afforestation Scheme and later members of the Women's Land Army.

In 1942 the house was purchased by Youth Hostels Association (England & Wales) and remains in use as a youth hostel.

See also

Listed buildings in Hawkshead

References

Grade II listed buildings in Cumbria
1821 establishments in the United Kingdom
Neoclassical architecture in Cumbria
Greek Revival houses in the United Kingdom
Youth hostels in England and Wales
Hawkshead